London Road is a popular road name in the United Kingdom. Roads called London Road include:

United Kingdom

England
There are countless London Roads in the UK.  Only those significant outside their local area are listed here:

London Road (Brighton) railway station
London Road (Guildford) railway station
London Road (Sheffield), Sheffield
London Road Stadium; the home ground of Peterborough United F.C.
Several stretches of the A4 road carry the name London Road

London

There are twenty six in London itself. They are:

London Road, Barking, in the borough of Barking and Dagenham
London Road, Beddington Corner, in the borough of Sutton
London Road, Brentford, in the borough of Hounslow, part of the A315 and extends into Hounslow
London Road, Bromley, in the borough of Bromley
London Road, Crayford, in the borough of Bexley, and follows part of the route of the Roman Watling Street
London Road, Croydon, in the borough of Croydon, part of the A23
London Road, Enfield, in the borough of Enfield
London Road, Feltham, in the borough of Hounslow.  This London Road is part of the A30 and is a continuation of its Brentford cousin, having produced several other names in between.
London Road, Forest Hill, in the boroughs of Southwark and Lewisham
London Road, Harrow, in the borough of Harrow
London Road, Hounslow, in the borough of Hounslow.  This London Road is part of the A315 and extends into Brentford
London Road, Kingston upon Thames, in the borough of Kingston upon Thames
London Road, Mitcham, in the borough of Merton.  This London Road is part of the A217 and should not be confused with its Morden neighbour
London Road, Morden, in the borough of Merton.  This London Road is part of the A24.
London Road, Norbury, in the borough of Croydon.  This London Road is part of the A23
London Road, Romford, in the borough of Havering
London Road, Stanmore, in the borough of Harrow
London Road, Southwark, in the borough of Southwark
London Road Depot, which services the London Underground Bakerloo line, is located on and named for this London Road
London Road, Sutton, in the borough of Sutton.  This London Road is part of the A24, and is a continuation of its Morden cousin, having produced several other names in between. It extends into Epsom and Ewell, a district officially outside London
London Road, Tooting, in the borough of Wandsworth.  This London Road is a part of the A217, which also runs through Mitcham.
London Road, Thornton Heath, in the borough of Croydon.  This London Road is part of the A23
London Road, Twickenham, in the borough of Richmond upon Thames
London Road, Wembley, in the borough of Brent

Most of the London Roads in London were named before the town they are in was absorbed by the London urban sprawl.  With few exceptions, they used to be the main route from their town to London.

Scotland
London Road, Glasgow. A large road leading to Mount Vernon to the east and Glasgow Cross to the west, passing Celtic Park and Glasgow Green on route.
London Road, Kilmarnock
London Road, Dumfries
London Road, Edinburgh
London Road, Stranraer

Northern Ireland
London Road, Belfast. A main road leading to the city's Ormeau Park.

Wales
London Road, Anglesey, an electoral ward in Holyhead, Anglesey

Elsewhere
London Road, Duluth, Minnesota, U.S. Minnesota State Highway 61 is on part of this road

See also
Odonymy in the United Kingdom

English toponymy
Street names of London
Lists of roads in the United Kingdom